Charkop is a locality in the suburb of Kandivali (West), North Mumbai. Charkop's original name is 'Char Khop'( चार खोप ) meaning a place of 4 huts or a small village with four houses in Marathi. Koli people or the fishermen are considered to be the indigenous residents of Charkop.

Charkop is the one of the oldest localities in Kandivali, comprising nine residential sectors.
It also has an industrial sector consisting of the house of Associated Capsules Private Ltd., IPCA Laboratories, Bhooj Adda and many other major industries.

Demographics

See also 
Mahavir Nagar (Kandivali)
 Kandivali

References

Suburbs of Mumbai